Barrettsville is an unincorporated community located in Dawson County, Georgia, United States.

History
James Tarrance Barrett, second son of John and Milly Rebecca Chastain Barrett, was born in South Carolina in 1803. He Died
January 19, 1867, at Barrettsville, Dawson County, Georgia. He was Buried at Concord Baptist Church, near Barrettsville.

During James's life he bought a trading post from Indians in Dawson County. As it became, and later bought a tract of land which 
was deeded to him by the state of Georgia. Later he was joined by his oldest brother Ruben N. Barrett, and his half brother John R. Barrett (Jack).
Thus the center became known as Barrettsville.

References

I have no online references only a book that was passed down my family called
"John Barrett of Hall County Georgia and his kin" by James P. Barrett. It was
last edited in 1983.

Unincorporated communities in Dawson County, Georgia
Unincorporated communities in Georgia (U.S. state)